Abdelkader El Mouaziz (born 1 January 1969) is a Moroccan long-distance runner. He holds the record for the most sub 2:10 marathon runs at 13, now tied with Stefano Baldini. El Mouaziz is a two-time winner of the London Marathon, in 1999 and 2001, and was the runner-up in 1998 and 2000. He also won the 1994 Madrid Marathon and the New York City Marathon in 2000. He was fifth at the 2002 Chicago Marathon.

Achievements

External links

All-time men's best marathon
El Mouaziz, Chepchumba, Ndereba extend best career marathon records
marathoninfo

1969 births
Living people
Moroccan male marathon runners
Athletes (track and field) at the 1996 Summer Olympics
Athletes (track and field) at the 2000 Summer Olympics
Olympic athletes of Morocco
London Marathon male winners
New York City Marathon male winners
20th-century Moroccan people
21st-century Moroccan people